James Murphy (born September 17, 1997) is an American soccer player who plays as a midfielder for Monterey Bay FC in the USL Championship.

Murphy grew up in Scotch Plains, New Jersey and attended Scotch Plains-Fanwood High School, where he was named as the 2013–14 Gatorade New Jersey Boys Soccer Player of the Year.

Club career

United States
Murphy came through the ranks at the Players Development Academy in his home state of New Jersey. He played for the United States under-20 team during the 2015 Stevan Vilotic Tournament and 2015 Four Nations Tournament. Also in 2015, Murphy went on trial with the Philadelphia Union of MLS but ended up not signing with the club.

Sheffield Wednesday
Murphy signed a professional contract for Sheffield Wednesday in June 2016.

In August 2016 he made his first team debut for the club, coming on as a substitute as Wednesday lost to Cambridge United in the first round of the Football League Cup.

Los Angeles FC
Murphy joined MLS side Los Angeles FC on March 2, 2018 ahead of their inaugural season. On May 22, 2018, he made his LAFC debut in a friendly against Borussia Dortmund.

Las Vegas Lights FC
Murphy joined USL side Las Vegas Lights FC on June 22, 2018 on a short-term loan. He had his first assist in his debut with the club on June 24, 2018 against Swope Park Rangers.

Arbroath
After a trial spell, Murphy signed with Scottish Championship club Arbroath in July 2019.

Rio Grande Valley FC
In July 2020,  returned to the United States, joining USL Championship side Rio Grande Valley FC.

Monterey Bay FC
Murphy signed with USL Championship expansion side Monterey Bay FC on February 8, 2022. Murphy was included in the starting 11 for Monterey Bay's inaugural match, a 4-2 loss to Phoenix Rising FC.

Personal life
Murphy has an older sister, Casey, and two younger brothers, John and Owen. Both brothers also play soccer, with John Murphy being a player for New York Red Bulls II, and Owen being of the Montclair University soccer team.

Career statistics

References

External links

 

1997 births
Living people
People from Scotch Plains, New Jersey
Sportspeople from Union County, New Jersey
Soccer players from New Jersey
American soccer players
Association football midfielders
Scotch Plains-Fanwood High School alumni
Sheffield Wednesday F.C. players
Los Angeles FC players
Las Vegas Lights FC players
Arbroath F.C. players
Rio Grande Valley FC Toros players
Monterey Bay FC players
USL Championship players
Scottish Professional Football League players
United States men's under-20 international soccer players
American expatriate soccer players
American expatriate sportspeople in England
American expatriate sportspeople in Scotland
Expatriate footballers in England
Expatriate footballers in Scotland